Rhynchonella boloniensis is an extinct species of brachiopod.

References 

Prehistoric brachiopods
Rhynchonellida